"R.I.P." is a song by Mexican singer Sofía Reyes, featuring British singer Rita Ora and Brazilian singer Anitta. The song was released on 15 March 2019 by Warner Music Latina, accompanied by its music video.

Background
Sofía Reyes announced the collaboration and the song title in a clip posted to her Twitter on 20 February 2019.

Composition
"R.I.P." was written by Reyes, Ora, Shari Lynn Short, Omar Tavarez, Thomas Augusto, Marco Masís, Chaz Mishan and David Delazyn. The latter two, Mishan and Delazyn (forming the duo The Fliptones) produced the track, along with Masís (Tainy). Rolling Stone described the song as starting with a "cumbia shuffle and infectious hook — evoking a slight inverse of Selena’s “Bidi Bidi Bom Bom”", while lyrically it "shrugs off negative vibes." Billboard magazine wrote how the collaboration "highlights the mix of nationalities, as it includes lines in Spanish, English and Portuguese."

Music video 
The music video for the song was released on 15 March 2019. Directed by Eif Rivera, it was filmed in Los Angeles. Rolling Stone called the video "vibrant" and "sumptuous". A vertical video for the song was also released as a Spotify exclusive. On November 8, 2019 won the Video Of The Year Award at the Los40 Music Awards 2019.

Charts

Weekly charts

Year-end charts

Certifications

References

External links
 
 

2019 songs
2019 singles
Sofía Reyes songs
Rita Ora songs
Anitta (singer) songs
Warner Music Latina singles
Songs written by Rita Ora
Songs written by Tainy
Song recordings produced by the Fliptones
Macaronic songs